The 2014 Virginia Cavaliers football team represented the University of Virginia in the 2014 NCAA Division I FBS football season. The Cavaliers were led by fifth year head coach Mike London and played their home games at Scott Stadium. They were members of the Coastal Division of the Atlantic Coast Conference.

Coming off of their worst season in over thirty years, Virginia attempted to rebound to bowl eligibility for the first time since 2011. Despite starting 4–2 in the front half of the season, including an upset Louisville, the Cavaliers suffered five in-conference losses, culminating in a loss to Virginia Tech. The season was the fourth losing record in Mike London's season at Virginia; however, athletic director Craig Littlepage announced prior to the final game that London would return for the 2015 season. They would finish the season 5–7, 3–5 in ACC play to finish in a three way tie for fifth place in the Coastal Division.

Schedule

Schedule Source:

Roster

Depth chart

Game summaries

UCLA

Richmond

Louisville

BYU

Kent State

Pittsburgh

Duke

North Carolina

Georgia Tech

Florida State

Miami (FL)

Virginia Tech

References

Virginia
Virginia Cavaliers football seasons
Virginia Cavaliers football